The Changsha building collapse occurred on 29 April 2022 in the Wangcheng District, Changsha, Hunan, China. The accident killed 53 people.

Background
The building was self-constructed.

Rescue efforts

Emergency services were called at around noon local time shortly after the collapse. Rescue efforts took place from 29 April to 5 May; a total of 10 survivors were rescued, with the final survivor reportedly being rescued 131 hours after the collapse.

Response
Chinese authorities arrested 9 people linked to the collapse.

References

2022 disasters in China
Building collapses in 2022
Building collapses in China
April 2022 events in China
Building collapse